Klann – grand guignol is a 1969 French-Belgian mystery film directed by Patrick Ledoux. It was entered into the 20th Berlin International Film Festival.

Cast
 Gabriel Cattand
 Ursula Kubler
 Marie Signe Ledoux
 David McNeil as Poitou
 Nathalie Vernier

References

External links

1969 films
1960s French-language films
1960s mystery films
Films directed by Patrick Ledoux
French mystery films
Belgian mystery films
French-language Belgian films
1960s French films